Donald "Don" James William Elgin (born 19 December 1975) is an Australian Paralympic amputee track and field athlete who won four medals at three Paralympics.

Personal
Elgin was born on 19 December 1975 in the Victorian town of Donald. He was born without a left leg and a left thumb, with small toes, and webbed fingers on both hands; his malformed left foot was amputated shortly after he was born and he had open heart surgery at the age of three. He was raised in the New South Wales town of Tocumwal, and competed in athletics and swimming as a teenager. He lives in Melbourne with his wife, three daughters and a son. He is the Founder and Managing Director of StarAmp Global, a boutique management company that specialises in managing and supporting paralympic competitors. He also works as a motivational speaker both in Australia and around the world.

Sports career

Elgin first participated in sports for people with disabilities at the 1990 New South Wales Amputee Championships. His first international competition was the 1994 IPC Athletics World Championships in Berlin, where he won a gold medal in the 4x100 m relay and a bronze medal in the high jump. He participated without winning any medals at the 1996 Atlanta Paralympics and came fourth in the pentathlon at the 1998 IPC Athletics World Championships in Birmingham. At the 2000 Sydney Paralympics, he won a bronze medal in the Men's Pentathlon P44 event. At the 2002 IPC Athletics World Championships in Lille, he won two silver medals in the pentathlon and 4x400 m relay and a bronze medal in the 4x100 m relay. At the 2004 Athens Paralympics, he won a silver medal in the Men's 4x400 m T42–46 event and two bronze medals in the Men's 4x100 m T42–46 and Men's Pentathlon P44 events. He came sixth in the pentathlon at the 2006 IPC Athletics World Championships, where he was the Australian flag-bearer at the opening ceremony, and commentated at that year's Commonwealth Games in Melbourne. He retired from para-athletics in 2008, but made a comeback in 2013 after learning that the sport would be included in the 2014 Glasgow Commonwealth Games. He came eighth in the Men's Discus Throw F42/44 at the games.

He was coached by Roy Boyd, Cath Woodruff, John Eden, De Jennings, and Peter Negropontis.  He held a scholarship from the Victorian Institute of Sport for 12 years. He is the team manager for the Australian Paralympic Athletics Team.

Recognition
In 2000, Elgin received an Australian Sports Medal for "service to amputee sport", in particular "development of junior athletes and track and field". In November 2018, he was awarded the Victorian Institute of Sport Frank Pyke Achievement Award.

Gallery

References

External links

Don Elgin's website
StarAmp Global
Don Elgin – Athletics Australia Results

1975 births
Living people
Australian male sprinters
Australian male high jumpers
Australian pentathletes
Paralympic athletes of Australia
Athletes (track and field) at the 1996 Summer Paralympics
Athletes (track and field) at the 2000 Summer Paralympics
Athletes (track and field) at the 2004 Summer Paralympics
Medalists at the 2000 Summer Paralympics
Medalists at the 2004 Summer Paralympics
Paralympic silver medalists for Australia
Paralympic bronze medalists for Australia
Paralympic medalists in athletics (track and field)
Commonwealth Games competitors for Australia
Athletes (track and field) at the 2014 Commonwealth Games
Sprinters with limb difference
High jumpers with limb difference
Australian amputees
Sportsmen from Victoria (Australia)
People from Donald, Victoria
Recipients of the Australian Sports Medal
Victorian Institute of Sport alumni
Paralympic sprinters
Paralympic high jumpers